Berkane Lakhdar Adda (born 5 November 1958) is an Algerian judoka. He competed in the 1980 Summer Olympics.

References

External links
 

1958 births
Living people
Judoka at the 1980 Summer Olympics
Algerian male judoka
Olympic judoka of Algeria
21st-century Algerian people